Puchong Perdana LRT station is a Light Rapid Transit station at Puchong Perdana, a townships in Puchong, Selangor. It operates under the Sri Petaling Line network, which is situated between Bandar Puteri and Puchong Prima station. The station accommodates 2 side platforms with 2 tracks. Like most other LRT stations operating in Klang Valley, this station is elevated.

The station is located on Persiaran Puchong Perdana with a roundabout connecting to Puchong Permai. It is located next to Kompleks Puchong Perdana, as well as the local landmark, Masjid As-Salam Puchong Perdana and Taman Tasik Puchong Perdana. Besides that, the Hilton Garden Inn Puchong and M Square shopping mall is just a short drive from the station. It mainly serves the residences of Puchong Perdana and Puchong Indah.

The station is a part of the Ampang and Sri-Petaling lines LRT Extension Project (LEP) announced in 2006. The station was opened in 30 June 2016 along with the rest of the stations in the extension project.

Bus Services

Feeder buses

Other buses

References

External links 

Puchong Perdana LRT Station

Ampang Line
Railway stations opened in 2016